Malcolm Alexander Gray (born 30 May 1940) is an Australia cricket administrator. He served as Chairman of the Australian Cricket Board from 1986 to 1989 and President of the International Cricket Council between 2000 and 2003. He was the first and to date only Australian to serve in the post.

References

External links
 

1940 births
Living people
Australian cricket administrators
People from Melbourne
Presidents of the International Cricket Council